Kuraio Mission is a village on the west coast of Bougainville Island, Papua New Guinea.

References 

Autonomous Region of Bougainville